Washington Academy and High School (commonly abbreviated to WAHS), also once known as simply Washington High School (WHS), is a public high school in Somerset County, Maryland, United States.  The school handles five grades:  8th grade is handled in the "academy" section of the school, while grades 9 through 12 are handled as high school.

The school is located on the Eastern Shore of Maryland in the town of Princess Anne in Somerset County.  The school is within walking distance of the University of Maryland Eastern Shore on Maryland Route 675, and just east of US 13.

Students
Washington's graduation rate has been steadily rising over the past 12 years.  In 2007, 81.7% of the class of 2007 graduated, up from 70.4% in 1996.

Washington Academy and High School is a fairly small high school.  In 2007, the school was near its 12-year high enrollment with 649 students, though 673 were enrolled in 2006.

{| class="wikitable"
|+Student population |-
|2007 ||        649
|-
|2006 ||	673
|-
|2005 ||        655
|-
|2004 ||        502
|-
|2003 ||	478
|-
|2002 ||	487
|-
|2001 ||	486
|-
|2000 ||        515
|-
|1999 ||	533
|-
|1998 ||	550
|-
|1997 ||	561
|-
|1996 ||	606
|-
|1995 ||        599
|-
|1994 ||	608
|-
|1993 ||        591
|}

SportsState Champions 2000 - Girls' Field Hockey 
 1999 - Girls' Field Hockey
 1985 - Softball 
 1982 - Baseball 
 1975 - Boys' Basketball 
 1959 - Boys' Track & Field 
 1958 - Boys' Track & Field
 1955 - Boys' Track & Field
 1954 - Boys' Track & Field
 1953 - Boys' Track & FieldFinalist 2013 - Boys' Basketball
 2012 - Boys' Soccer
 1995 - Softball
 1989 - Baseball
 1984 - Softball
 1975 - Baseball
 1972 - Boys' Basketball
 1957 - Boys' Track & Field
 1949 - Boys' Basketball
 1948 - Boys' BasketballSemi-Finals'''
 2011 - Boys' Soccer
 2010 - Boys' Soccer
 2003 - Football 
 1998 - Girls' Basketball 
 1996 - Girls' Basketball
 1983 - Baseball
 1980 - Baseball

References and notes

External links
 
 Map of School from Google Maps

Washington High School
Schools in Somerset County, Maryland